Richard Barclay Gallagher is a Scottish immunologist, science editor, and academic publisher. He is the president and editor-in-chief of Annual Reviews. He graduated with a doctoral degree from the University of Glasgow and was a researcher at Trinity College Dublin before he began working in academic publishing in 1989, holding positions with Elsevier and the journals Science and Nature. In the 2000s, he was the editor of the magazine The Scientist. In 2015, he became president and editor-in-chief of Annual Reviews, where he oversaw the expansion into new journal titles, launched its first online magazine Knowable Magazine, and developed the Subscribe to Open initiative for open access publishing.

Education
Richard Barclay Gallagher received a Bachelor of Science in immunology from the University of Glasgow in 1981. He earned a PhD in cell biology, also at the University of Glasgow, in 1985 under the advisorship of Adam S. G. Curtis. While a PhD student, he joined the British Society for Immunology. He was later a postdoctoral fellow at University College Dublin, where he researched sarcoidosis.

Career
From 1986 to 1989, Richard Gallagher worked as the Wellcome Trust Lecturer in Immunology at Trinity College Dublin. In 1989, he left academic research and began a career in publishing, becoming editor of the magazine Immunology Today, published by Elsevier, until 1992. From 1992 to 1999, he was office head and senior editor of the Europe Office of the journal Science. He was the chief biology editor at the journal Nature from 1999 to 2001, during which time he managed the publication of the papers reporting the sequencing of the human genome, and served as the publisher of Nature from 2001 to 2002.

In 2002, he was hired as editor of the magazine The Scientist ; he additionally became its publisher in 2004. During his tenure, he shifted the format from biweekly to monthly; its style changed from a "quirky tabloid" to a "stylish and engaging magazine". He published monthly editorials about topics such as vaccines, the longevity of punishment for scientific misconduct, and whether or not intelligent design should be taught in public schools. He worked at The Scientist for eight years, leaving in 2010.

In 2015, he became editor-in-chief and president of Annual Reviews, succeeding Samuel Gubins. While at Annual Reviews, he developed the "Subscribe to Open" initiative to remove paywalls from its review journals. Several new journal titles were added to Annual Reviews since his tenure began, including in cancer biology; biomedical data science; control, robotics, and autonomous systems; criminology; and developmental psychology. He also developed and launched Knowable Magazine, the first webzine published by Annual Reviews, which is written for a general audience.

Works

References

 Living people
Year of birth missing (living people)
Scottish scientists
Alumni of the University of Glasgow
British immunologists
Academic journal editors
Scottish editors